Karin Kavli (bon Karin Kristina Margareta Carlson; 21 June 1906 – 8 March 1990) was a Swedish stage and film actress and theatre director. She appeared in 20 films between 1933 and 1983.

Selected filmography
 Perhaps a Poet (1933)
 Under False Flag (1935)
 Walpurgis Night (1935)
 A Woman's Face (1938)
 Wanted (1939)
 Only a Woman (1941)
 The Yellow Clinic (1942)
 Som du vill ha mej (1943)
 Ön (1966)
 All These Women (1964)

References

External links
 

1906 births
1990 deaths
Swedish stage actresses
Swedish film actresses
Actresses from Stockholm
20th-century Swedish actresses
Swedish theatre directors
Litteris et Artibus recipients